Crawford Township is an inactive township in Osage County, in the U.S. state of Missouri.

Crawford Township was erected in 1841.

References

Townships in Missouri
Townships in Osage County, Missouri
Jefferson City metropolitan area